Willadele Givens is an American comedian, actress and writer. Beginning her career during the late–1980s in comedy, Givens television appearances include The Hughleys, Moesha, The Parkers, Comedy Central Presents, Def Comedy Jam, Russell Simmons Presents Def Poetry, Martin, Tracey Takes On... and The Steve Harvey Show.

Career
Givens was the 1989 Grand Prize Winner of the Crown Royal Comedy Contest held at the Regal Theater in Chicago. The next year, Givens was a finalist in the Miller Lite Comedy Search, which was won by Bernie Mac. Her movie appearances include The Players Club and Beauty Shop. Givens and fellow African American female comedians Mo'Nique, Laura Hayes and Sommore were the stars of The Queens of Comedy tour, filmed and shown on Showtime and released on DVD. In 2001, she hosted The Source'''s Hip Hip Awards Preshow which was shown on UPN. On September 7, 2018, Adele was featured on Kanye West's hit single, "I Love It", featuring American rapper Lil Pump; they performed the song on Saturday Night Live'' on September 29, 2018, however, Adele was not performing on the stage and was featured on the screen, wearing the same outfit as she wore in the music video.

References

Anonymous. "'Queen of Comedy' Adele Givens to perform at Funny Bone" Call & Post. Call and Post Newspapers P-W Publishing. 2006. HighBeam Research. 16 Aug. 2009 <https://web.archive.org/web/20020331041952/http://highbeam.com/>.
"Miller Comedy Search celebrates 16 years of hilarious comedy" Chicago Defender, Real Times Inc. 2003. HighBeam Research. 16 Aug. 2009 <https://web.archive.org/web/20020331041952/http://highbeam.com/>.
"Adele Givens: `Queen' for a while" Philadelphia Daily News (via Knight-Ridder/Tribune NewsService). 2003. HighBeam Research. 16 Aug. 2009 <https://web.archive.org/web/20020331041952/http://highbeam.com/>.

African-American actresses
African-American female comedians
Living people
Actresses from Chicago
American women comedians
American television actresses
Comedians from Illinois
21st-century American comedians
21st-century American actresses
Year of birth missing (living people)
21st-century African-American women
21st-century African-American people